Zulema Arenas (born 15 November 1995) is a Peruvian long-distance runner who specialises in the 3000 metres steeplechase. She broke the South American junior record for the event at the 2014 World Junior Championships in Athletics. She improved this further to 9:53.42 minutes at 2014 Ibero-American Championships in Athletics, winning a silver medal in the process. She holds the Peruvian record with her personal best of 9:52.88 minutes.

Personal bests
3000 metres steeplechase – 9:52.88 min (2016)
800 metres – 2:10.85 min (2015)
1500 metres – 4:19.14 min (2016)
3000 metres – 9:37.9 min (2016)
5000 metres – 16:48.18 min (2016)
2000 metres steeplechase – 6:40.28 min	(2012)

All information from All-Athletics

International competitions

References

External links

Living people
1995 births
Peruvian female steeplechase runners
Peruvian female middle-distance runners
Peruvian female cross country runners